Alexander  Manninger (born 4 June 1977) is an Austrian former professional footballer who played as a goalkeeper. He played internationally for the Austria national team on 33 occasions, including at UEFA Euro 2008, and has represented football clubs in Italy, Germany, Austria and England.

Club career

Salzburg, Steyr and Grazer AK
Manninger started his career as a youth player for SV Austria Salzburg in 1993. He was promoted to the first-team squad at the start of the 1995–1996 season. After his debut, and lone appearance of the season, he was sent on loan at SK Vorwärts Steyr, and played his first top-level game away against Grazer AK.

At the start of 1996–97 season he signed for Grazer AK, making his debut in place of the unfit first-choice keeper, in the autumn 1996 UEFA Cup second-round game against Internazionale Milano at the Stadio Giuseppe Meazza in Milan. He made twenty-four appearances in his lone season with Grazer AK, before a high-profile transfer to Arsenal in the Premier League, where he was understudy to the experienced David Seaman.

Arsenal, Fiorentina and Espanyol
During the 1997–98 season Seaman was injured and Manninger covered for him, enjoying a spell of six clean sheets in a row in the league, a joint club record. The last of these was against Manchester United at Old Trafford, where Arsenal won 1–0. In March 1998, he was named Premier League Player of the Month. However, Manninger had to make way for Seaman once the Englishman returned from injury. Despite only having played 7 games in the 1997–98 FA Premier League season (10 was then required to automatically qualify for a winners' medal), Manninger was granted special dispensation for a medal as his contribution to Arsenal's title win was considered to be significant enough. He also made 5 appearances in Arsenal's FA Cup run. The highlight for Manninger came in the quarter final replay at West Ham United. The game went to penalties and he saved Eyal Berkovic's spot kick to help Arsenal through to the semi finals. He was on the bench as Arsenal won the 1998 FA Cup Final to complete the double.

Manninger continued to deputise for Seaman for the next three seasons. He made sixty-four appearances over four seasons for Arsenal. After the Gunners bought Richard Wright in 2001, Manninger became number three at Arsenal, and spent the 2001–2002 season on loan at Italian side ACF Fiorentina, where he made twenty-four appearances for the Tuscan club.

In July 2002 RCD Espanyol signed Manninger on a four-year deal for £960,000. However, he was released after just two months at Espanyol without making a first team appearance with Manninger claiming that the Barcelona-based club had reneged on the contract.

Torino, Bologna, Siena and Salzburg 
Manninger subsequently joined Italian side Torino in Serie A in January 2003, and remained with them until the end of the season. At the start of 2003–04 he signed for Bologna FC where he spent two seasons largely used as an understudy. He had a short loan spell with Brescia Calcio in July 2004, but was subsequently loaned to A.C. Siena for the 2004–05 Serie A season during which Manninger made nineteen appearances in the league for the Robur.

In July 2005, FC Red Bull Salzburg re-signed Manninger from his parent club Bologna and during season 2005–06 he made sixteen appearances.

Return to Siena, Udinese and Juventus 
Manninger returned to Siena, in Serie A, this time on a permanent basis for the 2006–07 season. He started the season as the club's first choice keeper but he was injured and replaced by Greek international Dimitrios Eleftheropoulos, who retained the first team goalkeeper's jersey once Manninger was fit again. He was first choice again at the start of 2007–08 season, ahead of Eleftheropolous, and Anssi Jaakkola. In a two-year spell at Siena, Manninger made nearly 70 appearances.

In July 2008, as a non-contract player, he returned to Austria for another spell with FC Red Bull Salzburg, but before the season started he had signed for Udinese Calcio, where he replaced the Juventus-bound Antonio Chimenti. However, in a career of brief moves, he stayed with the north east Italian club for just two weeks before being signed by Juventus as backup for Gianluigi Buffon and  Chimenti in August 2008. A long-term injury to Buffon resulted in Manninger playing for the first XI from early October 2008 through to late February 2009. During his tenure with Juventus, Manninger made thirty-five appearances in all competitions, drawing praise in the media for his performances. Following an injury to Buffon during the 2010 World Cup, Juventus signed Marco Storari from Milan in the summer of 2010, and Manninger was demoted to the role of the club's third–choice goalkeeper. He was released at the end of the 2011–12 season, following Juventus's league title victory.

Augsburg
After four months without a club, Manninger signed for Bundesliga club FC Augsburg to cover for an injury to regular first-choice goalkeeper Simon Jentzsch. He made his competitive debut for Augsburg in a DFB-Pokal home match against FC Bayern Munich on 18 December 2012. In 2014, he signed a one–year contract extension. and was released at the end of his contract in June 2016 after having made 38 appearances in all competitions for the German side during his time with the team, 36 of which came in the Bundesliga.

Liverpool
During July 2016, Manninger trained with Liverpool to maintain match fitness and on 22 July 2016, he signed a short-term contract with the Merseyside club. On 25 May 2017, he announced his retirement from football at the end of his contract.

International career
Manninger made his debut for Austria in an August 1999 friendly match against Sweden and was member of the Austrian Euro 2008 squad. He earned thirty-three caps and retired after ten years from international football for the Austria national football team on 5 August 2009.

Style of play
An experienced goalkeeper, Manninger was known in particular for his shot-stopping, consistency, handling, and positional sense as a goalkeeper, although he was less effective at coming out to collect crosses. In his early career, he was considered to be a good back-up keeper, but was occasionally accused by pundits of lacking the ability to cope with pressure which was necessary for him to succeed in a starting role. He also stood out for his professionalism.

Personal life
Before playing football, Manninger was a carpenter. Since retiring from professional football, he has been focussing on his work in furniture and real estate. One such real estate venture for Manninger includes significant holdings in Meininger Hotels, a subsidiary of Holidaybreak.

Career statistics

Club

International

Honours
Arsenal
Premier League: 1997–98
FA Cup: 1998
FA Charity Shield: 1998, 1999

Juventus
Serie A: 2011–12

Individual
Premier League Player of the Month: March 1998

References

External links

 
 
 

1977 births
Living people
Footballers from Salzburg
Association football goalkeepers
Austrian footballers
Austria international footballers
UEFA Euro 2008 players
FC Red Bull Salzburg players
SK Vorwärts Steyr players
Grazer AK players
Arsenal F.C. players
ACF Fiorentina players
RCD Espanyol footballers
Torino F.C. players
Bologna F.C. 1909 players
A.C.N. Siena 1904 players
Udinese Calcio players
Juventus F.C. players
FC Augsburg players
Austrian Football Bundesliga players
Premier League players
Serie A players
La Liga players
Bundesliga players
Austrian expatriate footballers
Austrian expatriate sportspeople in Spain
Expatriate footballers in England
Expatriate footballers in Italy
Expatriate footballers in Spain
Expatriate footballers in Germany
Liverpool F.C. players
Austrian expatriate sportspeople in Germany
Austrian expatriate sportspeople in England
Austrian expatriate sportspeople in Italy